Wings is a 2012 Russian animated film directed by Olga Lopato. The English cast consists of Josh Duhamel, Hilary Duff, Rob Schneider, Jesse McCartney, and Tom Skerritt.

Plot

Determined to beat the bully, Cyclone, a young airplane named Ace asks a retired fighter plane named Colonel to train him for a famed airshow competition.

Cast
 Josh Duhamel as Ace
 Hilary Duff as Windy
 Rob Schneider as Dodo
 Jesse McCartney as Cyclone
 Jesse Pruett as Hail
 Tom Skerritt as Colonel
 Jeff Berg as Blue Baron
 Gregg Berger as Announcer Andy, Major Munson
 Dave Boat as Davidson
 Benjamin Diskin as Mr. Cumberbun, Patrick, Wicketts
 Ron Fleischman as Yellow Tractor
 Wes Hubbard as Hawk
 Diane Michelle as Rosie
 Scott Whyte as Red Tractor, Rinaldo

Sequel
There is a sequel, but spin-off to this film called Wings: Sky Force Heroes which was released in 2014. Josh Duhamel, Hilary Duff, and Tom Skerritt reprise their roles from the film with Rob Schneider and Jesse McCartney doing different roles and they are joined by Dallas Lovato and Russell Peters.

Another sequel titled Wings 2 was released on April 15, 2021.

References

External links
 
 

2012 films
2012 3D films
2010s Russian-language films
3D films
Animated films about aviation
Mockbuster films
Russian 3D films
Russian adventure comedy films
Russian animated films